The Qalyoub train collision occurred at a converging junction in Qalyoub to the north of Cairo in Egypt on 21 August 2006, when two commuter trains collided during the morning rush hour, killing 58 people and injuring over 140.

Overview 
A passenger train from Mansoura passed a red signal and crashed into a stationary train that had come from Benha. Four passenger cars derailed in the accident, which closed the line in the country's Nile Delta region. The driver of the Mansoura service was amongst the dead.

Aftermath 
In the wake of the accident, Egyptian National Railways director Hanafi Abdel Qawi was dismissed and 14 railway officials were later charged with gross negligence and jailed. The prosecutor's office said the officials ignored repairing some technical equipment that control train signals.

Egypt has a poor safety record on its railways and there are several fatal accidents each year, usually blamed on inadequately maintained equipment.

Families of each victim who died in the accident received compensation of £E5,000 (about $US870). Passengers who were injured will get £E1,000.

Proposed upgrade 
Egypt is proposing to implement an upgrade project including some upgrade of its signalling.

Similar accidents 

  1908 - Sunshine (Braybrook Junction)

See also 
 List of rail accidents in Egypt

References

External links 
 Egyptoday
 Gallery
 Accident Report

Qalyoub rail crash
Train collisions in Egypt
2006 in Egypt
Railway accidents involving a signal passed at danger
Qalyubiyya Governorate